Brezoaia may refer to:

 Brezoaia, a commune in Ştefan Vodă district, Moldova
 Brezoaia, a village in Brezoaele Commune, Dâmboviţa County, Romania
 Brezoaia River, a tributary of the Oituz River in Romania